This is a list of people executed in the United States in 2013. Thirty-nine people were executed in the United States in 2013. Sixteen of them were in the state of Texas. One (Kimberly LaGayle McCarthy) was female.

List of people executed in the United States in 2013

Demographics

Executions in recent years

See also
 Capital punishment in the United States
 List of juveniles executed in the United States since 1976
 List of women executed in the United States since 1976
 List of United States Supreme Court decisions on capital punishment

References

List of people executed in the United States in 2013
Executed in the United States in 2013
People executed in the United States
Executed in the United States in 2013
2013